John Shannon may refer to:

John Shannon (politician) (1862–1926), Australian politician
John Shannon (musician) (born 1980), American modern folk guitarist, vocalist, and composer
John Shannon (novelist) (born 1943), American author, lately of detective fiction
John Shannon (sportscaster) (born 1956), Canadian sportscaster & television producer
John W. Shannon (1933–2017), United States Under Secretary of the Army
John Shannon (defensive lineman) (born 1965), American football player
John Shannon (long snapper), American football player
John Shannon (NASA administrator), American administrator who presented the Shuttle-Derived Heavy Lift Launch Vehicle to the Augustine Commission